Jatobá is a city  in the state of Pernambuco, Brazil. The population in 2020, according with IBGE was 14,850 inhabitants and the total area is 277.86 km².

Geography

 State - Pernambuco
 Region - São Francisco Pernambucano
 Boundaries - Petrolândia   (N);  Alagoas state  (S);  Tacaratu  (E);  Bahia state  (W)
 Area - 277.86 km²
 Elevation - 297 m
 Hydrography - Moxotó River
 Vegetation - Caatinga hiperxerófila.
 Climate - Semi arid ( Sertão) hot
 Annual average temperature - 25.9 c
 Distance to Recife - 316 km

Economy

The main economic activities in Jatobá are based in commerce and agribusiness, especially creation of sheep, goats, cattle and chickens.

Economic Indicators

Economy by Sector
2006

Health Indicators

References

Municipalities in Pernambuco